Chulpo-ri is a village in Daehoji County, Dangjin City, Chungcheongnam-do, South Korea. It was originally under the jurisdiction of the neighbouring Haemi County, Seosan City, but was reassigned to Daehoji County in 1957.

History 
Ch'ulp'o is a village that is mostly known for celadon pottery. It is the main setting of A Single Shard.

References 

 Villages in South Korea
 Dangjin